Seeing I is an original novel written by Jonathan Blum and Kate Orman and based on the long-running British science fiction television series Doctor Who. It features the Eighth Doctor and Sam.

Continuity

The I also appear in the BBV audio play I Scream by Lance Parkin
The novel is partly set in a private prison called the Oliver Bainbridge Functional Stabilisation Centre, in which corporate spies and those who know too much are held. Orman's later novel Blue Box featured a high security mental institution called Bainbrige Hospital with a similar remit.
The Time Lord Savar from The Invasion of Time is briefly mentioned; the loss of his eyes here ties into his appearance in The Infinity Doctors.

External links
The Cloister Library - Seeing I (archived)

Reviews
The Whoniverse's review of Seeing I

1998 British novels
1998 science fiction novels
Eighth Doctor Adventures
British science fiction novels
Novels by Kate Orman
Novels by Jonathan Blum